The 2003 Rolex Sports Car Series season was the fourth season of the Rolex Sports Car Series run by the Grand American Road Racing Association.  The season involved four classes, Daytona Prototypes (DP), Sports Racing Prototype II (SRPII), Grand Touring Sport (GTS), and Grand Touring (GT).  12 races were run from February 1, 2003 to November 2, 2003. Barber Motorsports Park was added.

Schedule

Results 
Overall winners in bold.

1 - did not finish the race.

References

External links
 The official website of Grand-Am
 Grand American Road Racing Association - 2003 season archive
 World Sports Racing Prototypes - Rolex Sports Car Series 2003 results

Rolex Sports Car Series
Rolex Sports Car Series